Quilchena  may refer to:

 Quilchena, a small community on the south shore of Nicola Lake, British Columbia
 Quilchena Airport
 Quilchena Elementary School (Richmond)
 Quilchena Elementary School (Vancouver)
 Vancouver-Quilchena, an electoral district in British Columbia, Canada